Americana is the thirteenth studio album by American singer-songwriter Michael Martin Murphey and his second for Warner Bros. Records. Murphey found a receptive home with the label and began a long association with the label's president and resident producer, Jim Ed Norman. Unlike his previous albums, Americana contains material written mainly by other writers—Murphey only wrote or co-wrote three of the songs. The album's notable tracks include the #1 hit "A Long Line of Love" and the #4 "Face in the Crowd", the latter a duet with singer Holly Dunn. The album peaked at number 32 on the Billboard Top Country Albums chart.

Track listing

Credits
Music
 Michael Martin Murphey – lead vocals, acoustic guitar
 Lloyd Green – steel guitar
 Reggie Young – electric guitar
 Josh Goin – electric guitar
 Larry Byrom – acoustic guitar
 Billy Joe Walker, Jr. – acoustic guitar, electric guitar
 Mark Casstevens – acoustic guitar
 Josh Leo – electric guitar
 Steve Gibson – banjo, producer, acoustic guitar, electric guitar
 John Jarvis – piano
 Dennis Burnside – piano, synthesizer
 David Hoffner – piano, synthesizer
 Mike Lawler – synthesizer
 Dave Innis – synthesizer
 Barry Green – trombone
 George Tidwell – trumpet
 Buddy Skipper – clarinet
 Jim Horn – saxophone
 Michael Rhodes – bass
 Mike Brignardello – bass
 Eddie Bayers – drums
 Tommy Wells – drums
 Holly Dunn – vocals on “A Face in the Crowd”
 Gary Musick – background vocals
 Thomas Flora – background vocals
 Jim Photoglo – background vocals
 Ned Wimmer – background vocals
 Michael Lunn – background vocals
 Gary Janney – background vocals

Production
 Jim Ed Norman – producer

Chart performance

References

External links
 Michael Martin Murphey's Official Website

1987 albums
Michael Martin Murphey albums
Warner Records albums
Albums produced by Jim Ed Norman